Joseph "Pentland" Firth  (25 March 1859 – 13 April 1931) was a New Zealand educationalist and teacher. He was the headmaster of Wellington College from 1892 to 1920. He was born and died in Wellington.

Early life and family
Born in Wellington on 25 March 1859, Firth was the son of Aaron Firth, a stonemason, and Ann Firth (née Priestnell). The family moved to Cobden on the South Island's West Coast during the West Coast Gold Rush of 1864 to 1867.

On 8 May 1889, Firth married Janet McRae at the Church of St Michael and All Angels, Christchurch. The couple did not have any children.

Education and teaching career
Firth won a scholarship to Nelson College, and was a pupil there from 1873 to 1875. He taught there as a pupil-teacher until 1881, when he went to Wellington College as a junior master. In 1886, he took up a post at Christ's College, Christchurch, and began studying for his BA at Canterbury College, graduating in 1889. He was asked to become headmaster of Wellington College in 1892.

Among the boys at Wellington College he gained the nickname "Pentland" from his teaching about the troubles the Spanish Armada encountered around Pentland Firth in the north of Scotland. Thereafter he signed his name "J.P. Firth".

Sporting career

Cricket
Firth played six first-class cricket matches between 1880 and 1886, five for Wellington and one for Nelson. By far the best performance of his career came for Wellington against Hawke's Bay in February 1884, when he ran through the second innings with figures of 8 for 13. Captaining Wellington against Nelson in March 1885, he opened both batting and bowling, taking 3 for 27 and 2 for 19 and making 20 and 54, the highest score in the match. In the second innings he and William Salmon put on 100 for the first wicket, the first century stand made by Wellington batsmen for any wicket.

International Olympic Committee
Firth was the representative from New Zealand on the International Olympic Committee (IOC) from 1923 to 1927; his appointment by the IOC was delayed as he was quoted in a local newspaper that he was the delegate from New Zealand before he went (representatives are appointed by the IOC itself, not by the national Olympic committee).

Honours
In the 1922 King's Birthday Honours, Firth was appointed a Companion of the Order of St Michael and St George, for public services.

Death
Firth suffered from Parkinson's disease, and he died in Wellington on 13 April 1931.

References

External links
 
 Joseph Firth at Cricinfo

Further reading 
 Beasley, A. W. 'Firth, Joseph 1859 - 1931'.  Dictionary of New Zealand Biography 
 Insull, H. A. H. 'FIRTH, Joseph [Pentland], C.M.G.' Encyclopaedia of New Zealand 
 Joseph Firth, Wellington College, and the First World War 
 Elliott, James. Firth of Wellington, Whitcombe & Tombs, Auckland, 1937

1859 births
1931 deaths
New Zealand Companions of the Order of St Michael and St George
Cricketers from Wellington City
International Olympic Committee members
New Zealand referees and umpires
New Zealand cricketers
Nelson cricketers
Wellington cricketers
People educated at Nelson College
University of Canterbury alumni
Heads of schools in New Zealand